The Story of Star Wars is a 1977 record album presenting an abridged version of the events depicted in the film Star Wars, using dialogue and sound effects from the original film. The recording was produced by George Lucas and Alan Livingston, and was narrated by Roscoe Lee Browne. The script was adapted by E. Jack Kaplan and Cheryl Gard. The album was released on 20th Century Fox Records (T-550) and came with an illustrated book.

The original film became a hit in the days before home video, so for many fans at the time, this album was the closest to owning a copy of the film they could revisit whenever they wanted. The album was also released on compact cassette, 8-track tape, and 4-track reel-to-reel audio tape. It was a commercial success and achieved Gold Record status.

There were even foreign language versions of the album in French (L'Historie de La Guerre des étoiles, narrated by Dominique Paturel), German (Krieg der Sterne, narrated by F. J. Steffens), Spanish (La Historia de La Guerra de las Galaxias, narrated by José Catalá). Mexican Spanish (Argumento Completo Narrado de La Guerra de las Galaxias, narrated by León Canales) and Japanese (スターウォーズストーリー日本語版, The Star Wars Story - Japanese Edition, narrated by Taichirō Hirokawa). 

The sequel films were also given the same treatment of being turned into truncated audio dramas of their soundtracks, The Empire Strikes Back was adapted for records by RSO Records, under the subtitle The Adventures of Luke Skywalker with narration by Malachi Throne, and Return of the Jedi was also made by Walt Disney Productions into an abridged version for audio, under its Buena Vista Records banner and with narration provided by Chuck Riley.

See also
 Star Wars, a 1981 National Public Radio series that ran for 13 episodes.
 E.T. the Extra-Terrestrial, a 1982 record album that featured an abridged version of the events of the 1982 film.

References

Works based on Star Wars
1977 albums
20th Century Fox Records albums
Audiobooks by title or series
Children's albums
Star Wars (film)